The Second Circle is a 1990 Soviet Union drama film directed by Aleksandr Sokurov that tells the story of a young man who tries to deal with his father's death and the difficulties of his burial in a worldly society.

References

External links

Soviet drama films
1990 drama films
1990 films